Casino Helsinki is a casino located in Helsinki, Finland, located less than a ten minute walk from Central Railway Station. It's owned by government-owned Veikkaus and is one of the few casinos in the world, and the second in Finland, to donate all of its profits to charity. The other non-profit casino in Finland is Paf which donates all of its profits from the autonomous Åland islands. Casino Helsinki employs around 200 people, and it had around 305,000 visitors in 2009 with around 30 million euros of revenue.

The casino is open 363 days a year from 12pm to 4am. It has around 300 slot machines, over 20 gaming tables and a poker room.

Games

Table Games 
The selection of table games includes American roulette, blackjack, oasis poker, baccarat and Dynamic Poker Pro.

Poker 
There are seven poker tables at the casino. Depending on the demand, they may offer Texas Hold'em, Omaha Hold'em, Five-Card Stud, Seven-Card Stud, Chinese Poker, and Dealer's Choice. In addition to cash games, Casino Helsinki offers weekly tournaments and even the annual Finnish Poker Championships.

The most common forms of poker at Casino Helsinki are Texas Hold'em and Omaha Hold'em. The casino takes a 5% rake from cash game pots up to €10.

Bad Beat Jackpot 
All of the regular cash game poker games at Casino Helsinki are a part of a bad beat jackpot. If six or more players have been dealt a hand and the game goes to the flop, one euro of rake is taken from the pot (in addition to standard rake) and it goes to the jackpot.

In September 2021 the operator Veikkaus has added set loss limits to its land-based slot machines.

References

External links 
Casino Helsinki – Official Website

Casinos in Finland
Buildings and structures in Helsinki
Tourist attractions in Helsinki